PEOPLEnet is a mobile operator in Ukraine launched commercially in February 2007 by Telesystemy Ukrainy, becoming the first wireless network in Ukraine to offer 3G services (1xEV-DO standard). The operator has said it will have invested a total of US$180 million in network development by the end of 2007.

The service is currently (early 2009) commercially available in every regional capital (oblasnyi centr) of Ukraine as well as in a number of smaller cities. There were plans for service to cover 79% of the Ukrainian population by the end of 2009.

PEOPLENet is the first mobile operator in Ukraine to offer bundled airtime plans (when a monthly fee pays for a certain amount of voice minutes, text messages and data transfer) and flexible plans (a subscriber can modify his or her daily usage and service fee every day).

Criticism
PEOPLEnet has been criticized for building "3G" hype more on marketing than on technology. As of April 2007, not all base stations actually had the possibility to work in the 1xEV-DO mode, so that in fact a significant part of the network is actually an old 2.5G CDMA2000 1x network that previously operated under another brand name. PEOPLEnet is also being unofficially accused for playing on the anticipation of launch of "full 3G" UMTS networks that would bring not only faster rates than 1X for data-only connections, but also principally new services like video telephony. PEOPLEnet used to hide the actual type of its technical standard (CDMA2000 EV-DO) on their Web site, replacing it (even on pages with technical specifications of mobile terminals) with "3G", for example, writing "3G 1x" for phones that only support the 2.5G CDMA2000 1x technology.

References

External links
 

Companies established in 2006
Mobile phone companies of Ukraine
Telecommunications companies of Ukraine